The 2010 Memorial Cup was a four-team round-robin format tournament played during May 14–23, 2010 in Brandon, Manitoba. It was the 92nd annual Memorial Cup competition and determined the major junior ice hockey champion of the Canadian Hockey League (CHL). The Western Hockey League (WHL) announced on October 15, 2008, that the Brandon Wheat Kings were chosen to host the event at the Keystone Centre. Other tournament participants included the Windsor Spitfires, champions of the OHL, the Moncton Wildcats, champions of the QMJHL and the Calgary Hitmen, champions of the WHL. The Spitfires went 4–0 in the tournament, defeating Brandon 9–1 in the championship to claim their second straight Memorial Cup title.

Potential hosts 
The Brandon Wheat Kings, Everett Silvertips and Kelowna Rockets submitted applications to host the 2010 MasterCard Memorial Cup. Bid presentations took place on October 15, 2008 in Calgary, Alberta. The decision to award the hosting of the 2010 MasterCard Memorial Cup to Brandon was made by a majority vote of the WHL Board of Governors.

Just prior to the August application deadline, both the province of Manitoba and City of Brandon brought forth a combined $5,000,000 (CAD) in improvements to the Keystone Centre, in an effort to boost the Wheat Kings' chances at becoming host.

Round-robin standings

Schedule
All times local (UTC −6)

Round robin

Semi-final

Final

Statistical leaders

Skaters

GP = Games played; G = Goals; A = Assists; Pts = Points; PIM = Penalty minutes

Goaltending

This is a combined table of the top goaltenders based on goals against average and save percentage with at least sixty minutes played. The table is sorted by GAA.

GP = Games played; W = Wins; L = Losses; SA = Shots against; GA = Goals against; GAA = Goals against average; SV% = Save percentage; SO = Shutouts; TOI = Time on ice (minutes:seconds)

Rosters

Brandon Wheat Kings (Host)
Head coach: Kelly McCrimmon

Calgary Hitmen (WHL)
Head coach:Mike Williamson

Windsor Spitfires (OHL)
Head coach:  Bob Boughner

Moncton Wildcats (QMJHL)
Head coach: Danny Flynn

Awards
Stafford Smythe Memorial Trophy (MVP) – Taylor Hall (Windsor Spitfires)
Ed Chynoweth Trophy (Leading Scorer) – Taylor Hall (Windsor Spitfires)
George Parsons Trophy (Sportsmanlike) – Toni Rajala (Brandon Wheat Kings)
Hap Emms Memorial Trophy (Top Goalie) – Martin Jones (Calgary Hitmen)
All-Star Team:
Goaltender: Martin Jones (Calgary Hitmen)
Defence: Travis Hamonic (Brandon Wheat Kings), Cam Fowler (Windsor Spitfires)
Forwards: Taylor Hall (Windsor Spitfires), Jimmy Bubnick (Calgary Hitmen), Matt Calvert (Brandon Wheat Kings)

Road to the Cup

OHL playoffs

QMJHL playoffs

WHL playoffs

Media coverage 
All of the tournaments' games were televised throughout Canada on Rogers Sportsnet and in the United States on the NHL Network. The Brandon Sun, Brandon's local daily newspaper, covered the entire tournament in print as well as online.

References

External links
 Memorial Cup
 Canadian Hockey League

Memorial Cup tournaments
Memorial Cup 2010
Mem
2010 in Manitoba